Ron Hughes was a professional footballer who played as a goalkeeper for Workington in the Football League during the 1975–76 season.

References 

Year of birth missing (living people)
Living people
English Football League players
Association football goalkeepers
Workington A.F.C. players
Place of birth missing (living people)
English footballers